Tanks of the Ukrainian Army have been utilized within the military, with their usage and origin after the Cold War; and the modern era. This includes leftover Soviet tanks in the Ukrainian Ground Forces today as well as designs imported from other countries and tanks captured in the Russo-Ukrainian War.

History
Prior to the October Revolution of 1917, independent armed forces in Ukraine existed and had had distinct organisation and uniforms in both the First World War and the Second World War. These armed forces, and the independent Ukrainian homeland for which they fought, were eventually incorporated into the neighboring states of Poland, Soviet Union, Hungary, Romania and Czechoslovakia.

Collapse of the USSR
Upon their establishment in 1991, the Armed Forces of Ukraine included approximately 7,000 armored vehicles, 6,500 tanks, and 2,500 tactical nuclear missiles. Following the declaration of Ukrainian independence in 1991, Ukraine inherited the 1st Guards Army, 13th Army, 38th Army, two tank armies (the 6th Guards Tank Army and the 8th Tank Army), and the 32nd Army Corps at Simferopol. The 28th Guards Motor Rifle Division and the 180th Rifle Division were left in Ukraine, having been previously under the 14th Guards Army headquartered at Tiraspol in the Moldovan SSR.

Sources of tanks for Ukrainian ground forces
From 1991 the Ukrainian Ground Forces bought its military equipment only from Russia and other CIS states, as well as locally producing some of their own equipment. Until 2014 and the start of the war in Donbas, the defence industry in Ukraine produced equipment mostly for export.

Ukraine received a number of PT91 Twardy in 2022, a Polish main battle tank based on T-72M1 that developed sometime between the late 1980s and early 1990s. These PT91 Twardy had a new digital fire-control system, newly developed ERA and an uprated powerplant and had the Soviet-made Volna fire control system replaced by the Czechoslovak-made Kladivo FCS or by the Polish SKO-1 Mérida, which was originally designed for T-55AM "Merida", and is equipped with a Wola 850-horsepower diesel engine. Besides the new FCS, the Radomka passive night vision devices were installed in the driver's compartment, as was the Liswarta night sight, Obra laser illumination warning system, Tellur anti-laser smoke grenade launchers, solid or modular metal side skirts and the Polish-developed Erawa-1 or Erawa-2 explosive reactive armour was also fitted on the PT91 Twardy. Poland is said to have sent Ukraine some 232 T-72 tanks in its fight against the Russian invasion.  

Now in January 2023, Western countries have promised to deliver more than 300 tanks to Ukraine, with Leopord2 tanks, Challenger2 and the United States to deliver M1 Abrams.

Russian occupation of Crimea

In the aftermath of the 2014 Ukrainian Revolution, Russian special forces in unmarked uniforms began surrounding Ukrainian military bases on the Crimean peninsula before capturing them individually using a mixture of attrition and threats. Over the following weeks the Russian Armed Forces consolidated control of the peninsula and established road blocks to cut off the possibility of Ukraine sending reinforcements from the mainland. The takeover of Crimea was largely bloodless, as the Ukrainian soldiers didn't retaliate. By the end of March, all remaining Ukrainian troops were ordered to pull out of Crimea.

Russo-Ukrainian War

War in Donbas (2014–2022)

In the early months of the war in Donbas that erupted in 2014 the Armed Forces were widely criticised for their poor equipment and inept leadership, forcing Internal Affairs Ministry forces like the National Guard and the territorial defence battalions to take on the brunt of the fighting in the first months of the war.

By February 2018 the Ukrainian armed forces were larger and better equipped, numbering 200,000 active-service military personnel. Most of the volunteer soldiers of the territorial defence battalions were integrated into the official Ukrainian army.

Within the reporting period of 16 November 2017 to 15 February 2018 a United Nations OHCHR  monitoring mission documented 115 cases of credible allegations of human rights abuses committed  on  both sides of the contact line. The nature of the crimes ranges from enforced disappearances, looting of civilian property, torture, rape and sexual violence up to political repression and extrajudicial killings.

Full-scale Russian invasion 

On 24 February 2022, Russia began a full-scale invasion of Ukraine. The Ground Forces have been participants of most of the land combat actions of the current war. The influx of Western materiel and supplies to the branch before and during the conflict as well as mobilization efforts have resulted in a massive expansion of the force, in addition to ongoing force modernization. Ukraine in September of 2022 did a fall offensive that retook more than 3,088 sq miles from Russian control with armored forces supported by some of the vehicles from Western countries. It retook the major cities of Izyum and Kupiansk, which were key supply centers for the Russian forces. Ukrainian also formed large armor forces to attack around the Kherson in the south of the country, but the Russians retreated across the river before the main attack.

List of Tanks in Ukrainian Army

Tanks 
 M55S, T-62, T-64, T-72, PT-91 Twardy, T-80, T-84, T-90, M-84 main battle tanks in armored battalions

Main battle tanks

Current Structure

 1st Separate Tank Brigade, Honcharivske, Chernihiv Olbast
 3rd Separate Tank Brigade, Yarmolyntsi, Khmelnytsky Oblast
 4th Separate Tank Brigade, Honcharivske, Chernihiv Oblast
 5th Separate Tank Brigade, Kryvyi Rih, Dnipro Oblast
 12th Separate Tank Battalion, Honcharivske, Chernihiv Oblast
 14th Separate Tank Brigade, Odesa Oblast
 17th Separate Tank Brigade, Kryvyi Rih, Dnipro Oblast

See also

 T55
 T62
 T64
 T72
 T80
 T84
 PT-91#History, PT-91M
 M-84AS
 Karrar
 T-90
 Type 99 tank
 Leopard 1
 Leopard 2
 Challenger 2
 M1A
 History of the tank
 Tank classification
 List of military vehicles
 Armed Forces of Ukraine
 List of armoured fighting vehicles of Ukraine
 List of equipment of the Armed Forces of Ukraine
 List of equipment of the National Guard of Ukraine

References

Sources

External links

 T-84 Oplot Data Sheet and pictures
 Kharkiv Morozov Machine Building Design Bureau—Ukrainian producer of the T-80. KMDB's pages for T-80UD, T-84 Oplot, T-84 Yatagan, and T-84 Oplot-M.
 T-84 MBT at military-today.com
 Hromadske.ua, “Ukraine’s Tanks Are So Good, Its Own Army Can’t Afford Them,” 2017-09-14.